Poritia sumatrae is a butterfly in the family Lycaenidae. It was described by Cajetan Felder and Rudolf Felder in 1865. It is found in the Indomalayan realm.

In English, the species goes by the common names  Dark Grass Blue or Spotted Grass-blue.

Subspecies
Poritia sumatrae sumatrae (southern Burma, Thailand to Peninsular Malaysia, Singapore, Sumatra)
Poritia sumatrae milia Fruhstorfer, 1917 (Borneo)

References

External links
Poritia at Markku Savela's Lepidoptera and Some Other Life Forms

Poritia
Butterflies described in 1865
Butterflies of Asia
Taxa named by Baron Cajetan von Felder
Taxa named by Rudolf Felder